Princess in Love may refer to:

 Princess in Love, a 1994 book by Anna Pasternak and claimed to detail the affair of Diana, Princess of Wales with James Hewitt
 The Princess Diaries, Volume III: Princess in Love, a 2002 book by Meg Cabot and titled Princess Diaries: Third Time Lucky in the United Kingdom